A Quran Belt is a region where conservative Islamic values are strong. It is most commonly associated with an area where Islam has historically been influential in northwest China (Xinjiang, Ningxia, Gansu and Qinghai) along the borders of central Asia, Tibet and Mongolia.

Other parts of the world where Islam is or has historically been highly influential have also been referred to as the Quran Belt, such as Kabul
and Kandahar in Afghanistan, central Saudi Arabia, Southeastern Anatolia, Pakistan's Khyber Pakhtunkhwa, and India's Jammu and Kashmir territory, Lakshadweep islands, and Barak Valley region of Assam state.

In South East Asia, Aceh in Indonesia, and Kelantan and Terengganu in Malaysia are frequently referred to as Quran Belts because the governments of these localities impose a puritanical version of Islam which is not imposed in the rest of the country.

See also
Bible Belt

References

Quran
Belt regions